Os is one of three parishes in the municipality of Rakkestad in southeastern Norway.

The parish was separated from Rakkestad parish in about 1878.

References

Villages in Østfold